Daria or Darya is a traditional Russian female name, also used in some other predominantly Eastern Orthodox countries in Europe.

Origin 

Saint Daria of Rome is a venerated martyr of the Roman Catholic and Eastern Orthodox churches, which contributed to widespread adoption of the name. There are two theories as to its origin.

According to one version, Daria is the female variant of the Persian name Darius (via Latin Darius and  Dareĩos from Old Persian داریوش Dārayavauš, literally "he who holds firm the good", that is, "wealthy", "prosperous" or "maintaining possessions well"). The modern Persian male variant of the name, Daria (Darya), is commonly written as Dara. Daria is a Latinized Late Greek variant spelling of Darya. In Modern Persian, daryā (Old Persian drayah-) coincidentally means "sea".

On the other hand, Max Vasmer (among other linguists) regards Daria as a Russian form of the Greek name Δωροθέα (Dōrothéa; rendered in English as Dorothy). The Greek name means "God's Gift", from δῶρον ("gift") and θεός ("god").

The Russian name 

In 18th-century Russia, about 4% of women had the name Daria. By the late 19th century, the name came to be seen as rustic and became associated with peasant women. In the Soviet period, the name went out of fashion and by 1960 almost totally disappeared. Its popularity increased in the late 20th century, so that by 2006 it was the 3rd most popular name for girls born in Moscow and Saint Petersburg (after Maria and Anastasia). In some regions of Russia it was even the 2nd most popular name. In Romania, in 2014, Daria was the 8th most popular name for baby girls.

The common Russian diminutive form of this name is Dasha (Даша). The English form "Dolly" was used as a nickname for Darya in Leo Tolstoy's "Anna Karenina."

Spelling variants 

 Daryā Persian
 Dareia Late Greek
 Daria Latinized Late Greek, Italian, Polish, Romanian, Spanish & English
  Croatian, Macedonian, Lithuanian & Serbian
  Slovene
  Ukrainian & Bulgarian
  Belarusian
  Czech, Latvian & Slovene
 Daruška Czech
 Derya Kurdish
 Derya Turkish
 Daryna Ukrainian
 Tarja Finnish

People

Notable people 

 Daria Atamanov, Israeli rhythmic gymnast
 Daria Bijak, German gymnast
 Darya Dadvar, Iranian soprano soloist and composer
 Daria de Pretis, Italian judge
 Daria Dmitrieva, Russian rhythmic gymnast
 Dariya Nikitichna Dobroczajeva, Ukrainian botanist and university teacher
 Darya Domracheva, Belarusian biathlete
 Daria Dolan, American business news anchor, author and radio host
 Darya Dugina, Russian journalist and activist
 Daria Gaiazova, Russian-Canadian cross-country skier
 Daria Gavrilova, Russian-Australian tennis player
 Tarja Halonen, Finnish president
 Daria Halprin, psychologist, author, dancer and former actress
 Daria Hazuda, American biochemist
 Daria Joura, Russian-Australian gymnast
 Daria Kasatkina, Russian tennis player
 Daria Klimentová, Czech ballet dancer and teacher
 Darya Klishina, Russian long jumper and model
 Daria Kondakova, Russian rhythmic gymnast
 Daria Kozlova (disambiguation)
 Darya Kustova, Belarusian tennis player
 Daria Lorenci, Croatian actress
 Daria Marchenko, Ukrainian artist
 Daria Nauer, retired Swiss long-distance runner
 Daria Nekrasova, Belarusian-American actress and podcaster
 Daria Nicolodi, Italian actress and screenwriter
 Daria Obratov, Croatian luger
 Daria O'Neill, American radio and television personality
 Daria Onysko, Polish sprint athlete
 Daria Pratt, former American golfer
 Darya Pchelnik, Belarusian hammer thrower
 Daria Pikulik, Polish track cyclist
 Darya Pishchalnikova, Russian discus thrower
 Darya Poverennova, theatre and fil actress
 Darya Saltykova, Russian serial killer
 Daria Semegen, American composer
 Daria Serova, Russian freestyle skier
 Daria Shkurikhina, Russian gymnast
 Daria Strokous, Russian model and film actress
 Darya Safonova, Russian sprinter
 Darya Saltykova (disambiguation)
 Daria Timoshenko, Russian-Azerbaijani figure skater
 Daria Trubnikova, Russian rhythmic gymnast
 Tarja Turunen, Finnish singer
 Daria Usacheva , Russian figure skater
 Darja Varfolomeev, German rhythmic gymnast 
 Daria Virolaynen, Russian biathlete
 Daria Werbowy, Canadian-Ukrainian model
 Daria Widawska, Polish actress
 Daria Willis, American academic administrator and historian 
 Daria Yurlova (born 1992), Estonian biathlete
 Daria Zuravicki, American figure skater
 Daria Zhukova, Russian fashion designer
 Daria Spiridonova, Russian Artistic Gymnast

Fictional characters 
 Daria Morgendorffer, title character of the MTV animated series Daria (1997-2002)
Daria, main female character in the 1970's movie Zabriskie Point
 Princess Daria from the 2002 film The Princess and the Pea
Tharja, a character in the videogame Fire Emblem Awakening

Notes

References 

 

Czech feminine given names
Croatian feminine given names
Italian feminine given names
Persian feminine given names
Polish feminine given names
Russian feminine given names
Slavic feminine given names
Romanian feminine given names